WXGI (950 AM) is a classic hip hop formatted radio station licensed to Richmond, Virginia.  WXGI is owned and operated by Urban One.  The station's studios and offices are located just north of Richmond proper on Emerywood Parkway in unincorporated Henrico County, and its transmitter is located in the Southside of Richmond.

WXGI serves the Richmond/Petersburg area of Virginia using three simulcast stations, AM 1240 WTPS in Petersburg, 99.5 FM W258DC in Richmond and 102.7 FM W274PX in Petersburg.

History 
This station was signed on in the late 1940s by some ex World War II serviceman, which resulted in the call letters WXGI, as the station was founded by "ex-GIs" .

The Country Years 
Throughout the 1950s, 60s, and 70s, and early eighties the station was a popular country music station. George "Pops" Popkins and Johnny Gee were some of the better known DJs on WXGI.

The death of Johnny Gee 
In 1979 the station was dealt a blow when one of its most popular DJs, Johnny Gee (real name John Gallaher), was kidnapped and murdered by the infamous Briley Brothers outside of a nightclub his band was playing at when he caught them attempting to break in his car. His body was later found washed up on the shore of the James River. The brothers were later executed for that and other murders in the early eighties.

Changes in the 80s 
The station went through hard times in the eighties due to increased FM competition from two powerful FM country stations, WTVR-FM and WKHK. At first they tried going head to head with the FMs as "I-95". In the mid eighties they adopted an adult contemporary format as "Bright 95" but due to an outcry by longtime country music fans returned to the country format by 1989, this time featuring more classic country that the FMs stations had abandoned and calling themselves "The Legend". Some of the DJ who were on WXGI during this period were "Big" John Trimble, David Holt, Gretchen Hart, Bill James, Gary Micheals, and Eric Slater.

The Transition to Sports 
The station continued with the classic country format through the nineties and into the early 2000s, but then added a sports talk morning show with former WRNL Morning host "Big" Al Coleman. Finally in 2004, the station abandoned music altogether for an all sports format adding programming from ESPN Radio.

Recent history 
In 2006, the station was purchased by Red Zebra Broadcasting, which is owned by Washington Redskins owner Daniel Snyder. Former CEO of Red Zebra, Bennett Zier, stated at the time, "I am excited about our continued growth and our new ability to serve loyal Redskins fans in and around Richmond. WXGI is the perfect addition to our new group of radio stations."

ESPN 950 was part of the Redskins Radio Network, which carries all Redskins games throughout the season.  The station also broadcasts local sports talk every weekday, including "The Black & Drew Sports Huddle", "Border to Border with Matt Josephs" and "Hardly Workin' with Greg Burton."  In addition, WXGI carries University of Richmond Spiders football and basketball, Baltimore Orioles baseball, and other live sporting events syndicated by ESPN Radio, including Monday Night Football, MLB, NBA, and the College Football Playoffs.  Some live sports from NBC Sports Radio are also heard on WXGI.

On February 1, 2014, WXGI began simulcasting most of its programming on Hoffman Communications' WZEZ (100.5 FM).  That station was sold to the Educational Media Foundation and switched to a Contemporary Christian music format as WLRB on November 2, 2016.

On April 26, 2017, Radio One purchased WXGI from Red Zebra.

On April 19, 2021, the ESPN Radio format moved to SummitMedia's 106.1 FM W291CL while WXGI changed its format to classic hip hop, branded as "The Box".

Translator
On December 20, 2017, WXGI began relaying its signal on its own FM translator station.

Previous logo

References

External links

XGI
Radio stations established in 1947
1947 establishments in Virginia
Urban One stations
Classic hip hop radio stations in the United States